Desmia pantalis is a moth in the family Crambidae. It is found in Mexico (Colima).

References

Moths described in 1927
Desmia
Moths of Central America